Fallston is a hamlet in Cleveland County, North Carolina, United States. The population was 607 at the 2010 census.

History

Fallston was settled in the 1880s and incorporated in 1893, and named for John Z. Falls, Sheriff of Cleveland County.

Geography
Fallston is located at  (35.427407, -81.501802).

Demographics

As of the census of 2000, there were 603 people, 230 households, and 180 families residing in the town. The population density was 277.2 people per square mile (106.8/km2). There were 254 housing units at an average density of 116.8 per square mile (45.0/km2). The racial makeup of the town was 96.19% White, 2.99% African American, 0.17% Asian, 0.66% from other races. Hispanic or Latino of any race were 1.00% of the population.

There were 230 households, out of which 32.6% had children under the age of 18 living with them, 60.9% were married couples living together, 12.2% had a female householder with no husband present, and 21.7% were non-families. 20.9% of all households were made up of individuals, and 11.7% had someone living alone who was 65 years of age or older. The average household size was 2.52 and the average family size was 2.83.

In the town, the population was spread out, with 23.5% under the age of 18, 6.6% from 18 to 24, 26.7% from 25 to 44, 23.1% from 45 to 64, and 20.1% who were 65 years of age or older. The median age was 38 years. For every 100 females, there were 89.0 males. For every 100 females age 18 and over, there were 85.1 males.

The median income for a household in the town was $35,000, and the median income for a family was $41,042. Males had a median income of $33,125 versus $25,139 for females. The per capita income for the town was $17,415. About 13.1% of families and 13.8% of the population were below the poverty line, including 13.8% of those under age 18 and 19.3% of those age 65 or over.

References

Towns in North Carolina
Towns in Cleveland County, North Carolina